The 1992 500 km of Silverstone was the second race of the FIA Sportscar World Championship.  It was run on May 10, 1992.

Official results

Class winners in bold.  Cars failing to complete 90% of the winner's distance are marked as Not Classified (NC).

† - #4 Euro Racing was disqualified for using an illegal fuel compound.

Statistics
 Pole Position - Derek Warwick (#1 Peugeot Talbot Sport) - 1:24.421
 Fastest Lap - Yannick Dalmas (#1 Peugeot Talbot Sport) - 1:29.043
 Average Speed - 197.405 km/h

References

External links
 Official Results

500km Of Silverstone, 1992
6 Hours of Silverstone
Silverstone